Bodyworks Voyager is an educational first-person shooter for MS-DOS released in 1994. It was developed by Mythos Software and published by Software Marketing Corporation. The game teaches human anatomy, mixing shooter gameplay with quizzes on the human body.

Gameplay
Besides exploring the multiple layers and parts of the human body within the Medical Database, the prime objective of the game is to destroy all infecting microbes in a hospital patient by use of a fighter ship reduced by shrink ray and inserted into the body. All microbes must be destroyed to accomplish a mission and save the patient. There two kinds of microbes, one that attacks the patient more often and the latter that attacks the ship more often.

In the ship's control system there are four utilities. The target indicator determines where shots are fired. The patient screen indicates the patient's vitality and the microbe threat level presence. The radar show's the ship's and microbes' positions. The ship screen indicates the ship's vitality and firepower rate.

External links

Mirsoft World of Game Music - MIDI Music Files

1994 video games
DOS games
DOS-only games
Educational video games
First-person shooters
Medical video games
North America-exclusive video games
Video games about microbes
Video games developed in the United States